Transautomatism is a modern style of painting, founded by Friedensreich Hundertwasser. It is a kind of surrealism, focusing on the viewer's fantasy rather than an objective interpretation. Different people see different things in the same picture. The artist's intention is less pertinent to the end experience, therefore, than how the viewer chooses to interpret it. Transautomatism is based on the different styles which Hundertwasser developed, e.g. spirals and 'drops'.

Transautomatism is about Hundertwasser's theory that straight lines are 'godless and immoral'. That as humans we have lost our connection to the organic geometry of nature by forcing ourselves to exist in boxes as homes. He believed in the fluidity of line and shape hence his architectural and painting style. Being educated in a Montessori school his self-directed learning came from nature and therefore his drive to return to colour and organic states.

Surrealism